The 98th United States Congress began on January 3, 1983. There were four new senators (one Democrat, three Republicans) and 79 new representatives (56 Democrats, 23 Republicans) at the start of the first session. Additionally, two senators (one Democrat, one Republican) and nine representatives (six Democrats, three Republicans) took office on various dates in order to fill vacancies during the 98th Congress before it ended on January 3, 1985.

Due to redistricting after the 1980 census, 20 representatives were elected from newly established congressional districts. One representative-elect, Jack Swigert, died before taking office.

Senate

Took office January 3, 1983

Took office during the 98th Congress

House of Representatives

Took office January 3, 1983

Took office during the 98th Congress

See also 
 List of United States senators in the 98th Congress
 List of members of the United States House of Representatives in the 98th Congress by seniority

Notes

References 

98th United States Congress
98